El Waqf is a city in the Qena Governorate, Egypt. The former name of the city is al-Sanabisa.

See also
 List of cities and towns in Egypt

References 

Populated places in Qena Governorate